The 2014 Marshall Thundering Herd football team represented Marshall University in the 2014 NCAA Division I FBS football season. They were led by fifth-year head coach Doc Holliday and played their home games at Joan C. Edwards Stadium. They were a member of the East Division of Conference USA. They finished the season 13–1, 7–1 in C-USA play to win the East Division title. As East Division champions, they played West Division champion Louisiana Tech in the C-USA Championship Game, defeating the Bulldogs 26–23 to become C-USA Champions. They were invited to the inaugural Boca Raton Bowl, where they defeated MAC champion Northern Illinois, 52–23.

Schedule

Game summaries

Miami (OH)

Rhode Island

Ohio

Akron

Old Dominion

Middle Tennessee

Florida International

Florida Atlantic

Southern Miss

Rice

UAB

Western Kentucky

Louisiana Tech

Northern Illinois–Boca Raton Bowl

Rankings

References

Marshall
Marshall Thundering Herd football seasons
Conference USA football champion seasons
Boca Raton Bowl champion seasons
Marshall Thundering Herd football